The Sixth (translit. Shestoy) is a 1981 Soviet action film directed by Samvel Gasparov at Gorky Film Studio.

Plot
The Sixth is a parable about lawlessness and bureaucracy in the aftermath of the Great October Revolution. The film could be categorized as an "Ostern" type of movie, with a lawman hero who faces up to corruption against the odds, although no one around has any faith in his abilities.

It is set in 1923 and the Russian Civil War has come to an end, although the situation is still dangerous in some regions. An elusive band of White guards is hiding in the mountains, raiding Soviet institutions and making short work of the representatives of local government. Five chiefs have already been killed by the "whites" and the intimidated townsfolk believe the sixth one is also doomed. The protagonist is the sixth militia chief, but he is shrewder than his predecessors.

Recognizing the superior firepower of his well-armed and zealous enemies, he attempts to mobilise the people in the towns and help them regain faith and hope. He learns that there is a leak in his organisation and that someone is informing the band of all planned operations. He decides to use this very leak against the bandits.

Cast
Sergei Nikonenko - Roman Glodov
Vladimir Grammatikov - Pavlik
Mikhail Pugovkin - Mironych
Evgeny Bakalov - Aristarkh Lushkov
Timothy Spivak - Alexander
Sergey Ulyanov - Nikita
Maharbeg Kokoev - Ohrim

External links

Ostern films
1981 films
1981 in the Soviet Union
1980s Russian-language films
Gorky Film Studio films
Films directed by Samvel Gasparov
Films set in 1923
Soviet action films
1981 Western (genre) films
Russian Civil War films